De Goey is a surname. It most commonly refers to Jordan De Goey (born 1996), an Australian rules footballer for the Collingwood Football Club.

Other notable people with the surname include:

 Ed de Goey (born 1966), Dutch footballer
 Len de Goey (born 1952), Dutch footballer 
 Marijke de Goey (born 1947), Dutch visual artist

See also
 De Goeij, surname

Dutch-language surnames